Neckář (feminine Neckářová) is a Czech surname. Notable people include:
 Jan Neckář, Czech wrestler
 Stanislav Neckář, Czech ice hockey player
 Václav Neckář, Czech singer
 Zuzana Neckářová, Czech cyclist

Czech-language surnames
Occupational surnames